Psychotria zombamontana is a species of plant in the family Rubiaceae. It is found in South Africa, Tanzania and Zimbabwe.

References

zombamontana
Flora of Tanzania
Flora of Zimbabwe
Near threatened plants
Taxonomy articles created by Polbot